A swear jar (also known as a swearing jar, cuss jar, swear box or cuss bank) is a device to help discourage people from swearing.  Every time someone utters a swear word, others who witness it collect a "fine", by insisting that the offender put some money into the box. The container may be made of glass, porcelain, or metal, and may have a lid with a slot.  From time to time, the accumulated money may be used for some agreed-upon purpose, or contributed to charity.

The concept appears to have originated in the 1890s, under the name "swear box", and to have gained popularity in the 1910s. The term "swear jar" appears to have been invented in the 1980s in the United States, and is not documented in Great Britain; an early mention of a swear jar is in the 1988 U.S. movie Moving. The concept of swear box or jar became very popular in the 1980s.

A swear jar might not be a physical object; instead, a notional swear jar is referred to in order to indicate someone's use of bad language has been noted.

Commercially produced
Most swear jars are homemade, however tins and boxes specifically designed for the purpose are marketed commercially, some of which have a "scale of charges" printed on them. Various materials are used to produce them. Earlier designs were commonly porcelain. Modern versions, often glass, are available online via eBay, other shopping websites, and even sites dedicated to selling only swear jars.

See also

Aversion therapy
Behavior modification

References

Money containers
Profanity